Harry Davies may refer to:

Harry Davies (footballer, born in Chorley) (fl. 1922–1923), English footballer for Chorley, Port Vale and Bacup Borough
Harry Davies (footballer, born 1876) (1876–?), English footballer for Doncaster Rovers, Gainsborough Trinity, Hull City and Wolverhampton Wanderers
Harry Davies (footballer, born 1888) (1888–1958), English footballer for Stoke
Harry Davies (footballer, born 1904) (1904–1975), English footballer for Huddersfield Town, Port Vale and Stoke City
Harry Davies (rugby union, born 1899), Welsh international rugby player
Harry Davies (rugby union, born 1994), Welsh rugby union player
Harry Davies (politician) (1878–1957), Southern Rhodesian politician
Donny Davies (Harry Donald Davies, 1892–1958), English cricketer, amateur footballer and journalist
Harry Davies (socialist) (1888–1927), Welsh socialist politician and trade unionist
Harry Elinder Davies (1915–2005), Rhodesian and Zimbabwean lawyer and judge

See also
Harry Parr-Davies (1914–1955), Welsh composer and songwriter
Harry Davis (disambiguation)
Harold Davies (disambiguation)
Henry Davies (disambiguation)
Harrison Davies, a character in Tru Calling